Merton is a civil parish in the English county of Norfolk.
For the purposes of local government, it falls within the district of Breckland.

The villages name means 'Pool farm/settlement'.

Merton Hall is the home of Lord Walsingham.

Its church, St Peter's, is one of 124 existing round-tower churches in Norfolk and is a Grade I listed building.

Notes

External links

St Peter's on the European Round Tower Churches website

Villages in Norfolk
Civil parishes in Norfolk
Breckland District